Jeanne Brindeau (1860–1946) was a French stage and film actress.

Selected filmography
 Ramuntcho (1919)
 Enemies of Women (1923)
 The Clairvoyant (1924)
 The Fiery Cavalcade (1925)
 The Hearth Turned Off (1925)
 Michel Strogoff (1926)
 End of the World (1931)
 Les yeux noirs (1935)

References

Bibliography
 Michelangelo Capua. Anatole Litvak: The Life and Films. McFarland, 2015.

External links

1860 births
1947 deaths
French stage actresses
French film actresses
French silent film actresses
20th-century French actresses
Actresses from Paris